Reino Suojanen (3 September 1925 – 8 March 2016) was a Finnish footballer. He played in three matches for the Finland national football team from 1951 to 1953. He was also part of Finland's team for their qualification matches for the 1954 FIFA World Cup.

References

External links
 

1925 births
2016 deaths
Finnish footballers
Finland international footballers
Place of birth missing
Association footballers not categorized by position